Jafarabad (also Romanized as Ja‘farābād) is a village in Rostaq Rural District, Rostaq District, Darab County, Fars Province, Iran. At the 2006 census, its population was 28, in 6 families.

References 

Populated places in Darab County